Diarthrophallidae is a family of mites in the order Mesostigmata.

Species

Abrotarsala R. O. Schuster & F. M. Summers, 1978
Abrotarsala arciformis Schuster & Summers, 1978
Abrotarsala cuneiformis Schuster & Summers, 1978
Abrotarsala firundule Schuster & Summers, 1978
Abrotarsala inconstans Schuster & Summers, 1978
Abrotarsala longifemoralis Schuster & Summers, 1978
Abrotarsala obesa Schuster & Summers, 1978
Abrotarsala pyriformis Schuster & Summers, 1978
Abrotarsala rimatoris R. O. Schuster & F. M. Summers, 1978
Abrotarsala simplex Schuster & Summers, 1978
Abrotarsala simulans Schuster & Summers, 1980
Abrotarsala turgescentis Schuster & Summers, 1980
Acaridryas R. O. Schuster & F. M. Summers, 1978
Acaridryas miyatakei 
Africola Koçak & Kemal, 2008
Africola amnoni (Haitlinger, 2001)
Africola asperatus (Schuster & Summers, 1978)
Africola clypeolus (R. O. Schuster & F. M. Summers, 1978)
Atrema R. O. Schuster & F. M. Summers, 1978
Atrema crassa Schuster & Summers, 1978
Atrema nasica Schuster & Summers, 1978
Atrema parvula Schuster & Summers, 1978
Boerihemia Haitlinger, 1995
Boerihemia ajzoni Haitlinger, 1995
Brachytremella Trägårdh, 1946
Brachytremella spinosa Trägårdh, 1946
Brachytremelloides Womersley, 1961
Brachytremelloides brevipoda Schuster & Summers, 1978
Brachytremelloides mastigophora Schuster & Summers, 1978
Brachytremelloides minuta Schuster & Summers, 1978
Brachytremelloides striata Womersley, 1961
Diarthrophallus Trägårdh, 1946
Diarthrophallus aurosus Schuster & Summers, 1978
Diarthrophallus cartwrighti (Hunter & Glover, 1968)
Diarthrophallus crivatus Schuster & Summers, 1978
Diarthrophallus fulvastrum Schuster & Summers, 1978
Diarthrophallus joanae (Hunter & Glover, 1968)
Diarthrophallus quercus (Pearse & Wharton, 1936)
Eurysternodes Schuster & Summers, 1978
Eurysternodes tragardhi (Womersley, 1961)
Hyllosihemia Haitlinger, 1995
Hyllosihemia belerofoni Haitlinger, 1995
Liranotus R. O. Schuster & F. M. Summers, 1978
Liranotus liratus R. O. Schuster & F. M. Summers, 1978
Liranotus strigatus Schuster & Summers, 1978
Lombardiniella Womersley, 1961
Lombardiniella bornemisszai (Womersley, 1961)
Lombardiniella gentilis (Lombardini, 1944)
Lombardiniella lombardinii Womersley, 1961
Lombardiniella rogburi Haitlinger, 1995
Malasudis R. O. Schuster & F. M. Summers, 1978
Malasudis arii Haitlinger, 2001
Malasudis echinopus Schuster & Summers, 1978
Malasudis korae Haitlinger, 2001
Malasudis tribulus R. O. Schuster & F. M. Summers, 1978
Malasudis vernae Haitlinger, 2001
Minyplax R. O. Schuster & F. M. Summers, 1978
Minyplax africanus R. O. Schuster & F. M. Summers, 1978
Morvihemia Haitlinger, 1995
Morvihemia ghizari Haitlinger, 1995
Paralana R. O. Schuster & F. M. Summers, 1978
Paralana proculae R. O. Schuster & F. M. Summers, 1978
Passalana Womersley, 1961
Passalana peritrematica (Lombardini, 1951)
Passalobia Lombardini, 1926
Passalobia hunteri Schuster & Summers, 1978
Passalobia minygaster Schuster & Summers, 1978
Passalobia quadricaudata Lombardini, 1926
Passalobiella R. O. Schuster & F. M. Summers, 1978
Passalobiella colaptes Schuster & Summers, 1978
Passalobiella comantis Schuster & Summers, 1978
Passalobiella ctenophora Schuster & Summers, 1978
Passalobiella dubinerae (Hunter & Glover, 1968)
Passalobiella kolombiensis Schuster & Summers, 1978
Passalobiella patula Schuster & Summers, 1978
Passalobiella sellifera Schuster & Summers, 1978
Passalobiella spatha Schuster & Summers, 1978
Passalobiella subnuda Schuster & Summers, 1978
Polytrechna R. O. Schuster & F. M. Summers, 1978
Polytrechna serrula R. O. Schuster & F. M. Summers, 1978
Tenuiplanta R. O. Schuster & F. M. Summers, 1978
Tenuiplanta crossi (Hunter & Glover, 1968)
Tenuiplanta polypora Schuster & Summers, 1978
Troctognathus R. O. Schuster & F. M. Summers, 1978
Troctognathus tetradis R. O. Schuster & F. M. Summers, 1978

References

Mesostigmata
Acari families